Lisandro Alexis Henríquez Gómez (born 3 September 1982) is a Chilean football that currently plays for Chilean Primera B side Everton as a right back.

External links
 
 

1982 births
Living people
Chilean footballers
Chile international footballers
Everton de Viña del Mar footballers
Naval de Talcahuano footballers
C.D. Arturo Fernández Vial footballers
Universidad de Concepción footballers
Chilean Primera División players
Primera B de Chile players
Association football fullbacks